Tim Kleindienst (born 31 August 1995) is a German professional footballer who plays as a forward for 1. FC Heidenheim.

Club career
Kleindienst joined Energie Cottbus in 2010 from KSV Weißwasser. He made his 2. Bundesliga debut at 14 December 2013 against Fortuna Düsseldorf replacing Amin Affane after 78 minutes in a 3–1 home defeat.

On 20 May 2015, it was announced that Kleindienst would join SC Freiburg for the 2015–16 season.

On 2 September 2019, Kleindienst re-joined 1. FC Heidenheim having spent the 2016–17 season on loan at the club.

On 30 July 2020, Kleindienst signed for Belgian First Division A side Gent. The transfer fee was undisclosed.

References

External links
 

1995 births
Living people
Association football forwards
German footballers
Germany youth international footballers
Bundesliga players
2. Bundesliga players
3. Liga players
Belgian Pro League players
FC Energie Cottbus players
SC Freiburg players
1. FC Heidenheim players
K.A.A. Gent players
German expatriate footballers
German expatriate sportspeople in Belgium
Expatriate footballers in Belgium
People from Bad Muskau
Footballers from Saxony